Malcolm Carr Collier (née, Malcolm Carr; 1908–1983) was an American anthropologist remembered for her work with the Navajo. She did field work at Grand Coulee Dam in the U.S. state of Washington in 1936, studied the Navaho in the Pueblo Alto site with Katherine Spencer and Doriane Wooley in 1937, and in 1938, conducted research at the Navajo Mountain area. Her work with Spencer and Wooley, Navaho clans and marriage at Pueblo Alto, was published in 1939. Collier studied at the University of Chicago. She married the archaeologist, Donald Collier.

References

Bibliography

1908 births
1983 deaths
American women anthropologists
University of Chicago alumni
American anthropology writers
American women non-fiction writers
20th-century American anthropologists
20th-century American women
20th-century American people